Royston Arts Festival is a festival of the arts  organised by Creative Royston in Royston, Hertfordshire (UK). It was originally initiated and directed by the composer Richard Lambert (from 1982–1986) and was revived in 2007. It takes place annually in the last week of September. In recent years it has featured the trumpeter Alison Balsom, the theatre Director Robin Belfield, the author/illustrator James Mayhew, the poet Wendy Cope, Megson and the Daleks. In its earlier incarnation it was associated with the Master of the Queen's Music, Malcolm Williamson, who premiered at least one work at the festival. Voluntary arts groups who regularly contribute to the festival include the Corvus Amateur Drama Society (CADS), Royston Town Band, Royston Arts Society  and Royston Photographic Society.

References

External links 
 Royston Arts Festival web site<
 Royston Arts Festival on Twitter
 Royston Arts Festival on Facebook

Festivals in Hertfordshire
Royston, Hertfordshire